Gordon Burn-Wood (2 July 1914 – 8 October 1981) was a South African sailor. He competed in the Finn event at the 1960 Summer Olympics.

References

External links
 

1914 births
1981 deaths
South African male sailors (sport)
Olympic sailors of South Africa
Sailors at the 1960 Summer Olympics – Finn
People from Vryheid